Zhaoxiang is a town in Qingpu District, Shanghai, China.

Transportation
Zhaoxiang has access to Line 17 in Zhaoxiang Station. The G50 Shanghai–Chongqing Expressway and China National Highway 318 pass through the town.

Administrative Divisions
As of 2022, Zhaoxiang administers the following 3 residents' committees, 19 residential communities, and 8 villages:

 Zhaoxiang Residents' Committee
 Beisong Residents' Committee
 Xinzhen Residents' Committee
 Jinhulu Residential Community
 Jinhulu Second Residential Community
 Songhan Residential Community
 Songhu Residential Community
 Jiafu East Residential Community
 Songxin Residential Community
 Xiangjia Residential Community
 Huaqin Residential Community
 Huaxiu Residential Community
 Jiayu Residential Community
 Longlian Residential Community
 Xiujing Residential Community
 Jiahuang Residential Community
 Jiahui Residential Community
 Yitai Residential Community
 Yixiu Residential Community
 Longyu Residential Community
 Herui Residential Community
 Dekang Residential Community
 Nansong Village
 Fangxia Village
 Hemu Village
 Chuitao Village
 Shenjingtang Village
 Songze Village
 Zhongbu Village
 Jinhui Village

References

Towns in Shanghai
Divisions of Qingpu District